Gerald D. Bess (born May 24, 1958) is a former professional American football cornerback in the National Football League. He played in 1987 for the Buffalo Bills. He played six seasons in the Canadian Football League. Bess also led the Canadian Football League with 12 interceptions in 1984, he also had interception for 102-yard return for a touchdown.Bess had tryouts with the Tampa Bay Buccaneers, Atlanta Falcons, San Diego Chargers and mini camp with the Indianapolis Colts.Gerald Bess later became a pastor at New Commandment Christian Church in Atlanta.

References

1958 births
Living people
Players of American football from Pensacola, Florida
American football cornerbacks
Tuskegee Golden Tigers football players
Buffalo Bills players
Hamilton Tiger-Cats players
Ottawa Rough Riders players
Players of Canadian football from Pensacola, Florida
Christians from Florida